BNP Paribas Hong Kong SAR China and BNP Paribas Private Bank are subsidiaries of BNP Paribas and licensed banks in Hong Kong SAR China. It is one of the top foreign banks operating in Hong Kong SAR China.

BNP Paribas acquired Peregrine and renamed BNP Paribas Peregrine, a famous investment bank and brokerage in 1998. BNP Paribas Peregrine is headquartered in Hong Kong SAR China, with a presence in all major East Asian countries, as well as sales teams in London, Paris and Milan.
BNP Paribas has a branch in Macau, and also operational branches and two representative offices in mainland China.  The Peregrine name has since been absorbed and is no longer used.

See also
List of banks in Hong Kong SAR China

Banks of Hong Kong
Investment banks
BNP Paribas